Nuntakarn Aimsaard (born 23 May 1999) is a Thai badminton player. Aimsaard entered the international badminton circuit in 2015. She was part of the Thailand team that won the mixed team bronze medal at the 2017 Summer Universiade. She won her first BWF world tour title at the 2022 India Open in the women's doubles event partnered with her sister Benyapa Aimsaard.

Achievements

Southeast Asian Games 
Women's doubles

BWF World Tour (4 titles, 3 runners-up) 
The BWF World Tour, which was announced on 19 March 2017 and implemented in 2018, is a series of elite badminton tournaments sanctioned by the Badminton World Federation (BWF). The BWF World Tours are divided into levels of World Tour Finals, Super 1000, Super 750, Super 500, Super 300, and the BWF Tour Super 100.

Women's doubles

References

External links 

1999 births
Living people
Nuntakarn Aimsaard
Nuntakarn Aimsaard
Competitors at the 2021 Southeast Asian Games
Nuntakarn Aimsaard
Southeast Asian Games medalists in badminton
Nuntakarn Aimsaard